Leaving It Up to You may refer to:

"Leaving It Up to You", song by John Cale from Helen of Troy (album)
"Leaving It Up to You", song by George Ezra from Wanted on Voyage 2014  
"I'm Leaving It Up to You", song